Brigitte Jobbé-Duval is a French historian and linguist. Her works include Paris Chrétien en 600 Questions (1997), Le Livre des Porte-Bonheur (2009), Dictionnaire des Noms de Lieux des Pyrénées-Atlantiques (2009), and Souvenirs de la Vie Quotidienne 1939-1945 (2010) (cowritten).

References

20th-century French historians
Linguists from France
Living people
Year of birth missing (living people)
21st-century French historians
20th-century linguists
21st-century linguists
French women historians
Women linguists
21st-century French women writers
20th-century French women writers